Christopher Crawford (born June 1, 1950) is an American video game designer and writer. Hired by Alan Kay to work at Atari, Inc., he wrote the computer wargame Eastern Front (1941) for the Atari 8-bit family which was sold through the Atari Program Exchange and later Atari's official product line. After leaving Atari, he wrote a string of games beginning with Balance of Power for Macintosh. Writing about the process of developing games, he became known among other creators in the nascent home computer game industry for his passionate advocacy of game design as an art form. He self-published The Journal of Computer Game Design and founded the Computer Game Developers Conference (later renamed to the Game Developers Conference).

In 1992 Crawford withdrew from commercial game development and began experimenting with ideas for a next generation interactive storytelling system. In 2018, Crawford announced that he had halted his work on interactive storytelling, concluding that it will take centuries for civilization to embrace the required concepts.

Biography
Crawford was born in 1950 in Houston, Texas. After receiving a Bachelor's in physics from UC Davis in 1972 and a Master's in physics from the University of Missouri in 1975, Crawford taught at a community college and the University of California.

Crawford first encountered computer games in Missouri, when he met someone attempting to computerize Avalon Hill's Blitzkrieg. While teaching, he wrote an early version of Tanktics in Fortran for the IBM 1130 in 1976 as a hobby, then wrote Tanktics and an early version of Legionnaire for personal computers such as the KIM-1 and Commodore PET. In 1978 Crawford began selling the games and by 1979 "made the startling discovery," he later said, "that it is far more lucrative and enjoyable to teach for fun and program for money." He joined Atari that year, founding the Games Research Group under Alan Kay in 1982.

1980s

At Atari Crawford started game work with Wizard for the Atari VCS, but Atari Marketing decided not to publish this work. He then turned his attention to the new "Atari Home Computer System," now referred to as the Atari 8-bit family. His first releases on this platform were Energy Czar and Scram, both of which were written in  Atari BASIC and published by Atari.

He experimented with the Atari 8-bit computer's hardware-assisted smooth scrolling and used it to produce a scrolling map display. This work led to Eastern Front (1941), which is widely considered one of the first wargames on a microcomputer to compete with traditional paper-n-pencil games in terms of depth. Eastern Front was initially published through the Atari Program Exchange, which was intended for user-written software. It was later moved to Atari's official product line. He followed this with Legionnaire, based on the same display engine but adding real-time instead of turn-based game play.

Using the knowledge gathered while writing these games, he helped produce technical documentation covering the custom hardware of the Atari 8-bit family, from the hardware-assisted smooth scrolling to digitized sounds, with the information presented in a friendly format for a wide audience. This included videos distributed by ACE (Atari Computer Enthusiast) Support to user groups, and a series of articles published in BYTE magazine containing most of the content of the book, De Re Atari that would be published later by the Atari Program Exchange.

By 1983 BYTE called Crawford "easily the most innovative and talented person working on the Atari 400/800 computer today", and his name was well enough known that Avalon Hill's advertising for a revised version of Legionnaire mentioned Crawford as author. Laid off in 1984, in the collapse of Atari during the video game crash of 1983, Crawford went freelance and produced Balance of Power for the Macintosh in 1985, which was a best-seller, reaching 250,000 units sold.

Crawford wrote a non-fiction book published by McGraw Hill in 1984: The Art of Computer Game Design

Game Developers Conference
The Game Developers Conference, which in 2013 drew over 23,000 attendees, was conceived of in 1987. The first gathering was held in 1988 as salon in Crawford's living room with roughly 27 game design friends and associates. The gathering's original name, the Computer Game Developers Conference, would remain into the 1990s until the word Computer was dropped. While the GDC has become a prominent event in the gaming industry, Crawford was eventually ousted from the GDC board, and made his final official appearance at the gathering in 1994. He eventually returned to the conference, giving lectures in both 2001 and 2006.

Withdrawal from game industry
Crawford acknowledged that his views on computer game design were unusual and controversial. In a 1986 interview with Computer Gaming World he stated that he began writing software as a hobby that became a job with the goal of writing the best possible game. Crawford said that by 1982, his goal was to pursue computer games as an art form. While denouncing hack and slash games ("just straight run, kill or be killed"), text adventures ("about as interesting as a refrigerator light"), and the Commodore 64 and Apple II ("so gutless. I don't feel I can do an interesting game on them"), he stated that Danielle Bunten Berry, Jon Freeman and Anne Westfall, and himself were the only designers who had proven that they could develop more than one great game.

Crawford admitted that some critics called his games inaccessible:

At the 1992 CGDC, Chris Crawford gave "The Dragon Speech", which he considers "the finest speech of [his] life". Throughout the speech, he used a dragon as a metaphor for video games as a medium of artistic expression. He declared that he and the video game industry were working "at cross purposes", with the industry focusing heavily on "depth", when Crawford wanted more "breadth": to explore new horizons rather than merely furthering what has already been explored. He arrived at the conclusion that he must leave the gaming industry in order to pursue this dream. He declared that he knew that this idea was insane, but he compared this "insanity" to that of Don Quixote:

At the end of the speech, Crawford confronts the dragon:

Crawford then charged down the lecture hall and out the door.

Storyworlds
After his "Dragon" speech, at GDC 1993, and his apparent exit from the gaming industry, Crawford did appear at GDC the following year but had not abandoned his unconventional views on game design. Computer Gaming World wrote after the 1993 conference that Crawford "has opted to focus upon a narrow niche of interactive art lovers rather than continuing to reach as many gamers as possible". He served as editor of Interactive Entertainment Design, a monthly collection of essays written for game designers.

Since then, Crawford has been working on Storytron (originally known as Erasmatron), an engine for running interactive electronic storyworlds. , a beta version of the Storytronics authoring tool, Swat, has been released. The system was officially launched March 23, 2009, with Crawford's storyworld sequel to Balance of Power. As of December 1, 2012, the project has been in a "medically induced coma." In August 2013 Crawford released source code of several of his games from his career to the public, fulfilling a 2011 given promise, among them Eastern Front (1941) and Balance of Power.

People games
"People games", as termed by Crawford, are games where the goals are of a social nature and focus on interactions with well-defined characters. They are described in Chris Crawford on Game Design as well as in his "The Dragon Speech", as follows:

Bibliography
De Re Atari (contributor) (1982)
The Art of Computer Game Design (1984)
Balance of Power (Microsoft Press, 1986) - a book about the making of the game
The Art of Interactive Design (No Starch Press, 2002) 
Chris Crawford on Game Design (New Riders Press, 2003) 
Chris Crawford on Interactive Storytelling (New Riders Press, 2004)

Games
Tanktics (1978)
Energy Czar (1980)
Wizard (1980 but only released 25 years later, with the Atari Flashback 2)
Scram (1981)
Eastern Front (1941) (1981)
Legionnaire (1982)
Gossip (1983)
Excalibur (1983)
Balance of Power (1985)
Patton Versus Rommel (1986)
Trust & Betrayal: The Legacy of Siboot (1987)
Balance of Power: The 1990 Edition (1989)
The Global Dilemma: Guns or Butter (1990)
Balance of the Planet (1990)
Patton Strikes Back (1991)
Balance of Power: 21st Century (2009) 
Le Morte D'Arthur (2022)

References

External links

 Erasmatazz - Chris Crawford's personal website
 Chris Crawford profile at MobyGames
 A Conversation with Chris Crawford in The Escapist webmagazine
 Video Games are Dead: A Chat With Storytronics Guru Chris Crawford at Gamasutra
 , with Jason Rohrer and Chris Crawford

1950 births
American video game designers
Living people
Writers from Houston
Atari people
University of California, Davis alumni
University of Missouri alumni